"Shoot a Crooked Arrow" is the 35th episode of the Batman television series. It was the series' second season opener on ABC, originally airing on September 7, 1966 (with a repeat taking place on May 31, 1967), as well as the first to air first-run on ABC since the release of the 1966 Batman motion picture, and guest starred Art Carney as The Archer.

Plot
In Batman's first episode of the second season, The Archer, a villain modeled after Robin Hood, escapes from Police Headquarters in a moving van from the Trojan Hearse Company, driven by Maid Marilyn. Together, with his band of "merry malefactors" - Crier Tuck and Big John (a play on Friar Tuck and Little John, respectively) - he pays a surprise visit to Wayne Manor. The inhabitants are gassed and cash is stolen. Later, the crew attacks Police Headquarters. When they are giving out other stolen cash they are apprehended by Batman and Robin. The Gotham citizens enriched by the muggers save them from arrest.

Batman and Robin trace the Archer to his hideout at the Earl of Huntington Archery Range (Robin Hood was the alias of the Earl of Huntingdon) in Gotham's Green Forest section, where Alfred Pennyworth attempts to divert the antagonists long enough for Batman and Robin to inspect his lair. The two are trapped in a giant net.

The Archer threatens to behead Alfred if he does not get the location of the Batcave, so the crime computers can be destroyed. Knowing the guillotine is fake, Batman refuses and challenges Quigley to a fair duel. The Archer then sets up Batman and Robin to be skewered by lances.

Cliffhanger text
DOTH THIS FOUL DEED SPELL FINIS FOR THE CAPED CRUSADERS?
WILLST THE DYNAMIC DUO ESCAPE TO FIGHT AGAIN THE VILLAINOUS SWINE WHO THREATEN HOME AND HEARTH?
TAKE HEART, CITIZENS. THE ANSWER TO THESE AND OTHER POINTED INQUIRIES TOMORROW!
SAME BAT-TIME! SAME BAT-CHANNEL...!

Notes
 Art Carney (The Archer) is best known for his role of Ed Norton on The Honeymooners.
 Alfred was known as "the William Tell of Liverpool" and is an expert with the long-, short-, and crossbow.
 Episode production numbers appear at the end of the show's end credits throughout this season.
 A villain named "the Archer" first appeared in Superman #13 (November–December 1941). The criminal wore a green archer's costume and worked alone, extorting money from wealthy victims whom he would murder if they refused to pay.
 Dick Clark makes an appearance while Batman & Robin are climbing down a wall. Batman does not recognize him but says he must be from Philadelphia by his accent.
 Beginning this season, all of the onomatopoeia which appear during the climactic fight sequences were inserted in between shots, as opposed to being superimposed over the footage (like the first season and the movie), due to cutting down the massive budget devoted to camera and art work.
 Howie Horwitz's producing credit is now moved from the end credits to the episode sub-main title sequence.

External links
 

Batman (TV series) episodes
1966 American television episodes